Kirsti Leirtrø  (born 27 August 1963) is a Norwegian politician. 
She was elected representative to the Storting from the constituency of Sør-Trøndelag for the period 2017–2021 for the Labour Party. In the Storting, she was a member of the Standing Committee on Transport and Communications from 2017 to 2021. 

She was re-elected to the Storting for the period 2021–2025.

References

1963 births
Living people
Labour Party (Norway) politicians
Members of the Storting
Sør-Trøndelag politicians